The Canadian Army is the command responsible for the operational readiness of the conventional ground forces of the Canadian Armed Forces. It maintains regular forces units at bases across Canada, and is also responsible for the Army Reserve, the largest component of the Primary Reserve. The Army is headed by the concurrently held Commander of the Canadian Army and Chief of the Army Staff, who is subordinate to the Chief of the Defence Staff. The Army is also supported by 3,000 civilian employees from the civil service.

Formed in 1855, as the Active Militia, in response to the threat of the United States to the Province of Canada after the British garrison left for the Crimean War. This Militia was later subdivided into the Permanent Active Militia and the Non-Permanent Active Militia. Finally, in 1940, an order in council renamed the Active Militia to the Canadian Army.

On 1 April 1966, prior to the unification of the Canadian Armed Forces, the land forces were placed under a new command called Force Mobile Command. For two years following, the Army existed as a distinct legal entity before its amalgamation with the Royal Canadian Navy and the Royal Canadian Air Force to form the Canadian Armed Forces. In the 1990s, the command was renamed to Mobile Command, and then to Land Force Command, until it reverted to its original title in August 2011.

During its history, the Canadian Army has fought in a variety of conflicts, including in the North-West Rebellion, the Second Boer War, the First and Second World Wars, Korean War, and more recently with the Gulf War, and in the Afghanistan.

History

Formation 

Prior to Confederation in 1867, the British Army, which included both "Fencible" Regiments of the British Army—recruited within British North America exclusively for service in North America—and Canadian militia units, was responsible for the defence of Canada. Some current regiments of the Canadian Army trace their origins to these pre-Confederation militia and Fencible units. Following the passage of the Militia Act of 1855, the Permanent Active Militia was formed, and in later decades several regular bodies of troops were created, their descendants becoming the Royal Canadian Horse Artillery, the Royal Canadian Dragoons, and the Royal Canadian Regiment. The major operations that regular Canadian troops, in the 19th century, participated in included: the North-West Rebellion in 1885, and the Second Boer War.

World Wars 
During the First World War, the Canadian Army raised the volunteer Canadian Expeditionary Force (CEF) for service overseas, and was the primary Canadian participation to the war effort. 

The Canadian Army also fought during the Second World War. Following the declaration of war on Nazi Germany and her allies by the United Kingdom on 3 September 1939, with Prime Minister William Lyon Mackenzie King consulting with the Parliament of Canada and declaring war on 10 September 1939, the Canadian Army raised the Canadian Active Service Force, which initially consisted of the 1st Canadian Division; later increased to form the First Canadian Army. On 19 November 1940, during Second World War, an Order in Council was issued that renamed the Permanent Active Militia as the Canadian Army (Active), supplemented by the Non-Permanent Active Militia, which was named the Canadian Army (Reserve).

Post-war era and recent history (1945-present)
The Army participated in the Korean War, with the first elements of its participation landed in Korea in December 1950 and formed part of the forces who took part in Operation Killer and the Battle of Kapyong. Canadian troops were also committed to the NATO presence in West Germany during the Cold War.

In the years following its unification with the navy and air force in 1968, the size of Canada's land forces was reduced, however, Canadian troops participated in a number of military actions with Canada's allies. These operations included the Gulf War in 1991 and the invasion of Afghanistan in 2001, in addition to various peacekeeping operations under United Nations auspices in different parts of the world. Despite Canada's usual support of British and American initiatives, Canada's land forces did not directly participate in the Suez Crisis, the Vietnam War, or the Iraq War.

Structure

Command of the Army is exercised by the Commander of the Canadian Army within National Defence Headquarters located in Ottawa. The Army is divided into four geographical districts, the 2nd Canadian Division is based in Quebec, the 3rd Canadian Division is based in Western Canada, the 4th Canadian Division is based in Ontario, while the 5th Canadian Division is based in Atlantic Canada. and one operational division headquarters.

The single operational formation, 1st Canadian Division, is part of the Canadian Joint Operations Command, not operationally part of the Canadian Army. It serves as a deployable headquarters to command a divisional-level deployment of Canadian or allied forces on operations, succeeding the previous Canadian Joint Forces HQ.

In addition to the four regional command areas, the Canadian Army Doctrine and Training Centre, previously called Land Force Doctrine and Training System, commanded by a major-general and headquartered at McNaughton Barracks, CFB Kingston, Ontario, is responsible for the supervision, integration and delivery of Army training and doctrine development, including simulation and digitization. It includes a number of schools and training organizations, such as the Combat Training Centre at CFB Gagetown, New Brunswick, and the Canadian Manoeuvre Training Centre at CFB Wainwright, Alberta.

Canadian infantry and armoured regimental traditions are strongly rooted in the traditions and history of the British Army. Many regiments were patterned after regiments of the British Army, and a system of official "alliances", or affiliations, was created to perpetuate a sense of shared history. Other regiments developed independently, resulting in a mixture of both colourful and historically familiar names. Other traditions such as battle honours and colours have been maintained by Canadian regiments as well.

The senior appointment within the Canadian Army was Chief of the General Staff until 1964 when the appointment became Commander, Mobile Command in advance of the unification of Canada's military forces. The position was renamed Chief of the Land Staff in 1993. Following the reversion of Land Forces to the Canadian Army in 2011, the position became Commander of the Canadian Army.

Regular force

There are presently three Mechanized Brigade Groups in the Canadian Army's Regular Force. Approximately two-thirds of the Regular Force is composed of anglophone units, while one third is francophone. The Mechanized Brigades includes battalions from three infantry regiments, Princess Patricia's Canadian Light Infantry, the Royal Canadian Regiment, and the Royal 22e Regiment.

Between 1953 and 1971, the Regular Canadian Infantry consisted of seven regiments, each maintaining two battalions (except the Royal 22e Régiment, which had three; The Canadian Guards which had four battalions between 1953 and 1957; and the Canadian Airborne Regiment, which was divided into three commandos). In addition to the Canadian Guards, and the Canadian Airborne Regiment, The Queen's Own Rifles of Canada, and The Black Watch (Royal Highland Regiment) of Canada also fielded units that served in Regular Force.

In the years that followed the unification of the Canadian Armed Forces, several units of Regular Force were disbanded, or reduced to nil strength. On 15 September 1968, the 2nd Battalion, The Queen's Own Rifles of Canada was reduced to nil strength and transferred to the Supplementary Order of Battle. Several weeks later, The 1st Battalion of the Canadian Guards was disbanded on 1 October 1968.

In 1970, several more units were reduced to nil strength. The 1st Battalion, The Queen's Own Rifles of Canada was reduced to nil strength and transferred to the Supplementary Order of Battle on 27 April 1970, with the unit's personnel forming the 3rd Battalion, Princess Patricia's Canadian Light Infantry. Further reductions occurred from mid-June to early-July 1970, with the Regular Force unit from The Fort Garry Horse being disbanded on 16 June 1970. The 1st and 2nd Battalions of The Black Watch (Royal Highland Regiment) of Canada were reduced to nil strength on 1 July 1970, and transferred to the Supplementary Order of Battle. Several days later, on 6 July 1970, the 2nd Battalion, The Canadian Guards, were reduced to nil strength and transferred to the Supplementary Order of Battle; while its personnel became a part of 3rd Battalion, The Royal Canadian Regiment. After the Canadian Guards were reduced to nil strength, the role of the Household Troop reverted to the two seniormost infantry regiments of the Reserve. The respective battalions automatically relinquished its numerical battalion designation at that time.

During the 1990s, the Regular Force saw further organizational restructuring. The Canadian Airborne Regiment was disbanded in 1995, while the Regular Force regiment of the 8th Canadian Hussars (Princess Louise's), formed in 1957, was converted to a mixed Regular and Reserve "Total Force" unit with the close-out of 4 Canadian Mechanized Brigade Group at Lahr, Germany in 1994, before reverting to a Reserve regiment in 1997.

Reserve

The Army Reserve is the reserve element of the Canadian Army and the largest component of the Primary Reserve. The Army Reserve is organized into under-strength brigades (for purposes of administration) along geographic lines. The Army Reserve is very active and has participated heavily in all Regular Army deployments in the last decade, in some cases contributing as much as 40 per cent of each deployment in either individual augmentation, as well as occasional formed sub-units (companies). LFR regiments have the theoretical administrative capacity to support an entire battalion, but typically have the deployable manpower of only one or two platoons. They are perpetuated as such for the timely absorption of recruits during times of war. Current strength of the Army Reserve is approximately 18,000. On 1 April 2008, the Army Reserve absorbed all units of the former Communications Reserve.

Organization
The Canadian Army comprises:
 2nd Canadian Division
 2nd Canadian Division Headquarters
 4 Intelligence Company
 2 Canadian Ranger Patrol Group
 5 Area Construction Troop, 4 Engineer Support Regiment
 2nd Canadian Division Training Centre
 5 Canadian Mechanized Brigade Group
 34 Canadian Brigade Group
 35 Canadian Brigade Group
 2nd Canadian Division Support Group
 3rd Canadian Division
 3rd Canadian Division Headquarters
 6 Intelligence Company
 1 Canadian Ranger Patrol Group
 4 Canadian Ranger Patrol Group
 1 Area Construction Troop, 4 Engineer Support Regiment
 1 Military Police Regiment
 3rd Canadian Division Training Centre
 1 Canadian Mechanized Brigade Group
 38 Canadian Brigade Group
 39 Canadian Brigade Group
 41 Canadian Brigade Group
 3rd Canadian Division Support Group
 4th Canadian Division
 4th Canadian Division Headquarters
 2 Intelligence Company
 3 Canadian Ranger Patrol Group
 2 Military Police Regiment
 4th Canadian Division Training Centre
 2 Canadian Mechanized Brigade Group
 31 Canadian Brigade Group
 32 Canadian Brigade Group
 33 Canadian Brigade Group
 4th Canadian Division Support Group
 5th Canadian Division
 5th Canadian Division Headquarters
 3 Intelligence Company
 5 Canadian Ranger Patrol Group
 3 Military Police Regiment
 4 Area Construction Troop, 4 Engineer Support Regiment
 5th Canadian Division Training Centre
 36 Canadian Brigade Group
 37 Canadian Brigade Group
 5th Canadian Division Support Group
 Canadian Combat Support Brigade
 Influence Activities Task Force (PsyOps, CIMIC)
 Canadian Army Intelligence Regiment
21 Electronic Warfare Regiment
 4th Artillery Regiment, RCA
 4 Engineer Support Regiment
Additionally, the command comprises the Canadian Army Doctrine and Training Centre, which includes the following establishments:
 CADTC Headquarters
Command and Staff College
 Army Training Directorate
 CIMIC Directorate
 Army Doctrine Directorate
 Psyops Directorate
Combat Training Centre
 Environment Directorate
 School of Communications and Electronics
 Digitization Office
 Lessons Learned Centre
Peace Support Training Centre
Canadian Manoeuvre Training Centre

Personnel

Rank and insignia

Military rank in the Canadian Army is granted based on a variety of factors including merit, qualification, training, and time in-rank. However, promotion up to the rank of corporal for non-commissioned members, and to captain for officers, is automatic based on time in previous rank. Some ranks are associated with specific appointments. For example, a regimental sergeant major is held by a chief warrant officer, or adjutant held by a captain. In some branches or specific units, rank titles may differ due to tradition. A trained private within the Royal Canadian Armoured Corps is a trooper, whereas the same rank within the artillery is gunner. Other titles for the rank of private include fusilier, sapper, rifleman, craftsman, and guardsman. The ranks of the Canadian Army are as follows:

Meals

Field kitchens and catering are used to feed members of the Canadian Army personnel at bases and overseas operation centres. For personnel on patrol away from bases, they are supplied Individual Meal Packs (IMPs). The IMP is used by the Canadian Forces. Other types of rations are used by the Canadian Forces, notably fresh rations, or cooked meals provided directly from the kitchen or by haybox. There are also patrol packs, which are small high-protein snack-type foods (such as beef jerky or shredded cheese) and boxed lunches (consisting of assorted sandwiches, juice, fruit, pasta and a dessert) provided for soldiers to consume in situations in which meal preparation is not possible.

Uniforms

The Canadian Army maintains a variety of different uniforms, including a ceremonial full dress uniform, a mess dress uniform, a service dress uniform, operational/field uniforms, and occupational uniforms. Canada's uniforms developed parallel to that of the British from 1900 to the unification of the Canadian Armed Forces in 1968, though maintained significant differences. The adoption of a number of separate uniforms for separate functions, also made its uniforms become distinctively "Canadian" in the process. 

Prior to unification in 1968, the uniforms between the three branches were similar to their counterparts in the forces of the United Kingdom and other Commonwealth countries, save for national identifiers and some regimental accoutrements. The Honourable Peter MacKay, Minister of National Defence, announced on 8 July 2013 the Government of Canada's intent to restore Canadian Army rank insignia, names and badges to their traditional forms.

The Canadian Army's universal full dress uniform includes a scarlet tunic, midnight blue trousers with a scarlet trouser stripe, and a Wolseley helmet. However, a number of regiments in the Canadian Army are authorized regimental deviations from the Army's universal design; including some armoured, Canadian-Scottish regiments, and all rifle/voltigeur regiments. The full dress uniforms of the Army regiments originated from the Canadian militia, and was eventually relegated from combat to ceremonial use.

The present service dress uniform includes a rifle green tunic and trousers, similar to the older iteration of the service dress, although with a different cut, and an added shoulder strap. The present service dress uniforms were introduced in the late 1980s, alongside the other "distinctive environmental uniforms" issued to other branches of the Canadian Armed Forces. From the unification of the armed forces in 1968, to the introduction of the distinctive service uniforms in the 1980s, the branches of the Canadian Armed Forces wore a similar rifle green service uniform.

The Canadian Army began to issue combat specific uniforms in the early 1960s, with the introduction of "combats," coloured olive-drab shirt. The olive-drab uniforms continued to be used with minor alterations until the Army adopted CADPAT camouflaged combat uniforms in the late-1990s. With the adoption of CADPAT, the Canadian Armed Forces became the first military force to adopt digital camouflage pattern for all its units.

Officer training 
Officers are selected in several ways:

The Regular Officer Training Plan, where candidates are educated at the Royal Military College of Canada (RMC) or at civilian Canadian universities.
 Direct Entry Officer Plan, for those who already hold a university degree or technology diploma.
 Continuing Education Officer Training Plan, addresses shortages in certain officer occupations, and is intended to attract candidates who are otherwise qualified for service as officers, but who lack a degree. Candidates complete their degrees while serving in the Army.
 University Training Plan (Non-Commissioned Members), designed to develop selected serving non-commissioned members for service as career officers in the Regular Force. Normally, candidates selected for this plan will attend RMC or a civilian university in Canada.
Commissioning from the Ranks Plan, provides officers to augment the number of officers commissioned through other plans and applies exclusively to those who have acquired some military experience and possess the necessary qualities that make them suitable for employment as officers.
 Special Requirements Commissioning Plan, is designed to meet the needs of the officer occupations. It allows the Canadian Forces to profit from the skills and experience of senior non-commissioned members and may provide an opportunity for career advancement for selected deserving Chief Warrant Officers.
Subsidized special education, which includes the Medical Officer Training Plan or Dental Officer Training Plan.
In addition, there were other commissioning plans such as the Officer Candidate Training Plan and Officer Candidate Training Plan (Men) for commissioning serving members which are no longer in effect.

Occupational training for Canadian Army officers takes place at one of the schools of the Combat Training Centre for Army controlled occupations (armour, artillery, infantry, electrical, and mechanical engineers, etc.), or at a Canadian Armed Forces school, such as the Canadian Forces School of Administration and Logistics, or the Defence Public Affairs Learning Centre for Officers from career fields controlled outside the Army.

Equipment

Canada is an industrial nation with a highly developed science and technology sector. Since the First World War, Canada has produced its own infantry fighting vehicle, anti-tank guided missile and small arms for the Army. Regular and reserve units operate state-of-the-art equipment able to handle modern threats through 2030–2035. Despite extensive financial cuts to the defence budget between the 1960s–2000s, the Army is relatively well equipped. The Army currently operates approximately 10,500 utility vehicles including G-wagon and 7000-MV and also operates approximately 2,700 armoured fighting vehicles including the LAV-III and the Leopard 2. The Army also operates approximately 150 field artillery pieces including the M777 howitzer and the LG1 Mark II.

In the near future, between 2011 and 2017, the Army will receive a new family of tactical armoured patrol vehicles which will eventually replace the RG-31 Nyala and Coyote Reconnaissance Vehicle, known as the Textron Tactical Armoured Patrol Vehicle. The dismounted soldiers will be equipped with the long-awaited Integrated Soldier System designed to improve command execution, target acquisition and situational awareness. The Army will receive a new family of engineering vehicles especially designed to clear pathways for troops and other vehicles through minefields and along roadside bombs and improvised explosive devices. This new family of vehicles will eventually replace the aging fleet of AEV Badger, ARV Taurus and AVLB Beaver.

The Army infantry uses the C7 Rifle or C8 Carbine as the basic assault rifle, with grenadiers using the C7 with an attached M203 grenade launcher, and the C9 squad automatic weapon. The Canadian Army also uses the Browning Hi-Power and the SIG Sauer P226

Newer variants of the C7/C8 family have since been integrated into common use throughout the Canadian Armed Forces. The C7 has most recently been updated in the form the C7A2. The major internal components remain the same, however, several changes have been made to increase versatility of the rifle.

Tactical communication is provided via the Iris Digital Communications System.

Heraldry

The badge of the Canadian Army consists of:

 St. Edward's Crown
 Three red maple leaves on one stem
 Crossed swords

Bases and training centres 

 2nd Canadian Division
 2nd Canadian Division Support Base Montreal
 Garrison Valcartier
 Garrison St Jean
 2nd Canadian Division Training Centre Valcartier
 3rd Canadian Division
 3rd Canadian Division Support Base Edmonton
 Garrison Wainwright
 Garrison Shilo
 3rd Canadian Division Training Centre Wainwright
 3rd Canadian Division Training Centre Detachment Shilo
 4th Canadian Division
 4th Canadian Division Support Base Petawawa
 Canadian Forces Base Kingston
 4th Canadian Division Training Centre Meaford
 5th Canadian Division
 5th Canadian Division Support Base Gagetown
 5th Canadian Division Training Centre Gagetown
 5th Canadian Division Training Centre Detachment Aldershot

Canadian Army Journal
Since 1947, the Canadian Army has produces a peer-reviewed academic journal called the Canadian Army Journal. In 1965, prior to the unification of the Canadian Armed Forces, the journal was merged with similar publications from across the services. In 1980, the Canadian Army Doctrine Bulletin began printing as the successor to the original journal, and in 2004 the publication returned to its original name.

See also 

 ABCANZ Armies
 Arctic Response Company Group
 Canadian Army Trophy
Royal Canadian Armoured Corps
Royal Canadian Infantry Corps
Royal Regiment of Canadian Artillery
Canadian Military Engineers
Canadian Special Operations Forces Command
 Formation patches of the Canadian Army
 List of units of the Canadian Army
 Regimental nicknames of the Canadian Forces
Canadian Military Bands
 Soldier Apprentice
 Combat Team
Supplementary Order of Battle
List of historical equipment of the Canadian military

References

Citations

Notes

Bibliography

Further reading
 Kasurak, Peter. A National Force: The Evolution of Canada's Army, 1950–2000 (Vancouver: UBC Press, 2013)

External links 

 
 Faces of War: The Canadian Army at Library and Archives Canada
 army.ca - Army.ca, a web forum and interactive wiki dealing with both current and historical issues related to the Canadian Army.
 Battle Honours in the Canadian Army by J.R. Grodzinski
 Canadiansoldiers.com
 Salute to the Canadian Army

 
Federal departments and agencies of Canada
1867 establishments in Canada
Military units and formations of Canada in World War II